Nijasharana Shri Ambigara Chowdaiya (also spelled Caudayya) was a saint, poet and social critic in 12th century India. Influenced by Basava, his somewhat crude writings were critical of the higher castes. He has been described by K. A. Paniker as the angriest of the poets in the vachana movement. Revered as a saint because of his 274 inspiring Pravachans, he also challenged those who harassed women and those he considered to be religious charlatans. He taught that god certainly dwells in the heart of one who is pure in thoughts, words and deed.

A cave is named after Chowdaiya on the outskirts of Basavakalyan in Karnataka and that state's Department of Kannada and Culture assists in the annual celebrations of his jayanti.

See also 
 List of Koli people
 List of Koli states and clans

References 

People from Kalyan, India
Koli people
12th-century Indian poets
Lingayat poets
Lingayat saints
Indian social reformers
Kannada Hindu saints
Shudra Hindu saints